Aurélien Agbénonci (born 1958) is a Beninese diplomat who has served in the government of Benin as Minister of Foreign Affairs since 2016. Previously he was Deputy Special Representative of the Secretary-General for the United Nations Multidimensional Integrated Stabilization Mission in the Central African Republic (MINUSCA).

Education
Agbénonci earned graduate degrees in international trade law from the University of Paris X Nanterre and in institutional development, governance and environmental sciences from the University of Dakar in Senegal. He also holds a master's degree in business law from the University of Dakar.

Career
Prior to his career with the United Nations, Agbénonci was Senior Programme Coordinator and Chief of Staff at the Pan–African Social Prospects Centre in Benin, and worked in the Faculty of Law at the University of Nanterre in France. He has served throughout Africa, including as Deputy Resident Representative of the United Nations Development Programme (UNDP) in Côte d’Ivoire, from 1999 to 2003, and Cameroon, from 1996 to 1999. He was United Nations Resident Coordinator and UNDP Resident Representative in Rwanda, from 2008 to 2011, and Congo, from 2003 to 2008. Agbénonci was the Humanitarian Coordinator, United Nations Resident Coordinator and UNDP Resident Representative in Mali from 2012 to 2013.

Agbénonci was appointed as Deputy Special Representative, as well as the United Nations Resident Coordinator and the UNDP Resident Representative, by United Nations Secretary-General Ban Ki-moon on 25 April 2014. When Patrice Talon took office as President of Benin on 6 April 2016, he appointed Agbénonci as Minister of Foreign Affairs and Cooperation.

See also
List of current foreign ministers

References

External links

 

Living people
Beninese diplomats
University of Paris alumni
Cheikh Anta Diop University alumni
1958 births
Beninese officials of the United Nations
Foreign ministers of Benin
Date of birth missing (living people)
Place of birth missing (living people)
Beninese expatriates in France
Beninese expatriates in Senegal
Beninese expatriates in Ivory Coast
Beninese expatriates in Cameroon